Baltica, or Baltika, may refer to:
 Baltica, an ancient continent.
 The Baltic states: Estonia, Latvia, Lithuania.
 Baltika Breweries, the largest brewery in Eastern Europe. 
 Baltika Group, Estonian fashion brandhouse and retailer.
 Baltica (festival), folklore festival in Baltic states.
 Baltica (computer), a Soviet/Russian clone of ZX Spectrum.
 FC Baltika Kaliningrad, a football (soccer) club.
 Baltika, a Russian icebreaker.

See also 
 Baltic (disambiguation)